KSTM (88.9 FM) is a radio station licensed to Indianola, Iowa, United States.  The station is owned by Simpson College.

References

External links

STM
Radio stations established in 1983